The Mt Baldy School District consists of one school, Mt Baldy School, that serves students in grades K-8 in Mount Baldy, California, USA.

References

External links
Mt Baldy School Website

School districts in San Bernardino County, California